Ling Qing (1923 – September 10, 2010), original name Lin Moqing, was a Chinese diplomat. He was born in Fuzhou, Fujian. He was a descendant of Lin Zexu. He was a graduate of Beijing No. 4 High School and Yenching University. He was Ambassador of the People's Republic of China to Venezuela and Permanent Representative of China to the United Nations (1980–1985). He was a member of the 8th Chinese People's Political Consultative Conference.

1923 births
2010 deaths
Politicians from Fuzhou
Beijing No. 4 High School alumni
Yenching University alumni
Ambassadors of China to Venezuela
Permanent Representatives of the People's Republic of China to the United Nations
Members of the 8th Chinese People's Political Consultative Conference
People's Republic of China politicians from Fujian